

Countess of Foix

House of Foix, 1010-1302

House of Foix-Béarn, 1302-1412

House of Foix-Grailly, 1412-1517

House of Albret, 1517-1572

House of Bourbon, 1572-1607

See also 
List of Navarrese consorts

Sources 
TOULOUSE NOBILITY:COMTES de FOIX

 
Foix